Schistophleps bicolora is a moth in the family Erebidae. It was described by George Thomas Bethune-Baker in 1904. It is found in New Guinea.

References

Natural History Museum Lepidoptera generic names catalog

Moths described in 1904
Nudariina